I-War is a shooter video game developed by Imagitec Design and published by Atari Corporation exclusively for the Atari Jaguar in North America and Europe on December 15, 1995. It was the last title developed by Imagitec for the Jaguar before the company ended their relationship with Atari Corp., who would discontinue the platform in April 1996.

When the databases of the Override mainframe supercomputer began mutating and blocking the I-Way computer network, the player is tasked in piloting an antivirus tank vehicle and enter into the virtual world to clear out the network, eliminate computer viruses and eradicate the mutated databases. The game was originally announced in late 1994 under a different title.

I-War received mixed to negative reception when it was originally released.

Gameplay 

I-War is a shooter game that is primarily played in a first-person perspective, where the player takes control of an antivirus tank vehicle in order to enter into the virtual world of a worldwide computer network nicknamed "I-Way" and fight computer viruses, in addition of destroying mutated databases and collect datapods as main objectives through 21 different levels, each one increasing in scope and complexity as the player progresses through the game, with later levels introducing new enemy types and weapons that can be equipped for the player's tank. Before starting the game, the player has the option to choose between three different types of tanks, with each having their own advantages and disadvantages. There are three difficulty levels that the player can choose at the options menu, while other settings are available by entering a cheat code. There is also a two-player versus mode.

During gameplay, the player can change the camera angles by pressing their respective number on the controller's keypad, in addition of activating a level map and other features. Unlike other games in the genre that were released for the system such as Cybermorph and Hover Strike, the levels in I-War are sorted into enclosed chambers with one-way teleportation in order to avoid repeating levels. Once the set number of mutated databases are destroyed and collecting the number of datapods within the respective level, the player has to come back to the starting point and enter into the Data Link bonus rounds, which involves grabbing datapods in an attempt to gain an extra life by either increasing or decreasing the tank's speed, while also acting as transition points to upper levels. After completing the level, the player can choose to save or not their progress, which is kept via the cartridge's internal EEPROM, while high-scores and other setting changes are automatically saved internally. If all lives are lost, the game is over.

Plot 
In the future and after 20 years of being in development, the Override mainframe supercomputer, which is buried on the South Pole in order to keep its core at very low temperatures from overheating, went online on schedule and its main function is to handle information of the ever-increasingly complex internet, called I-Way, through advanced processing capabilities that the technology inside of the supercomputer offers and as such, society started depending on it and worked for years without exhibiting issues until its databases started mutating and computer viruses began to clog the I-Way, leading to delays, slow information transfers, among other issues that brings the Override to the point of self-destruction as a result of the now-mutated databases. In response to the situation, the player is assigned to pilot an antivirus tank vehicle in order to destroy mutated databases and viruses that are clogging the I-Way, in addition to collecting datapods. After traversing multiple nodes, the player finally arrives to the Override Central Block and destroys the boss database by overloading it with viruses, saving I-Way in the process until next time.

Development and release 
I-War was originally advertised under the name Redemption in late 1994 and was also known internally as Dreadnaught, with plans to be originally released around the second quarter of 1995. The music was composed by Alastair Lindsay. Development of the game was completed on December 11, 1995, a few days before release. The game was showcased during the Fun 'n' Games Day event hosted by Atari.

Reception and legacy 

I-War received mixed to negative reception since its release.

In 1997, two years after its release, the game's trademark was abandoned.

Notes

References

External links 
 I-War at AtariAge
 I-War at GameFAQs
 I-War at Giant Bomb
 I-War at MobyGames

1995 video games
Atari games
Atari Jaguar games
Atari Jaguar-only games
Commercial video games with freely available source code
Imagitec Design games
Multiplayer and single-player video games
Science fiction video games
Shooter video games
Split-screen multiplayer games
Tank simulation video games
Video games about virtual reality
Video games developed in the United Kingdom
Video games scored by Alastair Lindsay
Video games set in the future
Works set in computers